The 1980–81 James Madison Dukes men's basketball team represented James Madison University during the 1980–81 NCAA Division I men's basketball season. The Dukes, led by ninth year head coach Lou Campanelli, played their home games at the on-campus Godwin Hall and were members of the southern division of the Eastern Collegiate Athletic Conference (ECAC). 

The 1980–81 Dukes won the 1981 ECAC South tournament by beating Richmond and therefore received an automatic bid to the 1981 NCAA Division I basketball tournament. This was the first team from James Madison to make the  NCAA Division I tournament. As the tenth-seed in the East Region, the Dukes beat Georgetown before being beaten in the second round by Notre Dame.

Schedule and results

|-
!colspan=9 style=|Regular Season

|-
!colspan=9 style=|ECAC South tournament

|-
!colspan=9 style=|NCAA Tournament

Source:

References 

James Madison Dukes men's basketball seasons
James Madison
James Madison
James Madison Men's Basketball
James Madison Men's Basketball